Charles R. Smith (born January 20, 1928) was an American politician in the state of Florida.

Smith was born in Webster, Florida and attended the University of Florida. He was a businessman. He served in the Florida House of Representatives for the 61st district from 1978 to 1992, as a Democrat.

References

Living people
1928 births
Members of the Florida House of Representatives
People from Brooksville, Florida
People from Sumter County, Florida